Landore Low Level railway station served the district of Landore, in the historical county of Glamorganshire, Wales, from 1881 to 1954 on the Morriston Branch.

History 
The station was opened on 9 May 1881 by the Great Western Railway. The services were suspended on 9 May 1921 to save coal from the trains due to a coal strike. They resumed on 20 June 1921. The station closed on 4 January 1954.

References 

Disused railway stations in Swansea
Railway stations in Great Britain opened in 1881
Railway stations in Great Britain closed in 1954
1881 establishments in Wales
1954 disestablishments in Wales